Count Pavel Yulievich Suzor (French: Paul-Jules Persin comte Suzor, 1844–1919) was a Russian architect, president of the Architects Society, and count.

Biography 
Count Paul-Jules de Persin-Suzor was born in Saint-Petersburg, Russian Empire, to a French political immigrant and nobleman, Count Jean Baptiste Jules de Persin-Suzor (1801-1889) and  Marie Laurence Stéphanie de Livio. His great-grandfather, a French nobleman Jean Baptiste Persin Dubois, married Countess Elizabeth de Suzur and received the comital title through that marriage.

Suzor graduated from the Saint Petersburg Imperial Academy of Arts in 1866. He started to work for the city council in 1873, and in 1883 he started to teach at the Saint Petersburg Institute of Civil Engineering. Suzor practiced Eclecticism and Art Nouveau in his designs. In 1903 Suzor became chairman and president of the Architects Society. In 1907 he cofounded the Museum of Old Saint Petersburg at his own house.

Works 

There are over 80 buildings designed by Pavel Suzor in Saint Petersburg.

Apartment houses 
 Nevsky 63 - Nevsky Prospekt 63 (1872)
 Ushakov House - Nevsky Prospekt 49 (1882-1883)
 Egorov House - Nekrasov Street 40 (1883-1884)
 Ratkov-Rozhnov House - Griboedov Canal Embankment 71 (1886-1888)
 Badaev House - Bolshoy Avenue 49 (1902-1903)

Baths 
Suzor paid special attention to baths

 Voronin baths  - Fonarny Lane 1 (1870-1871)
 Egorov baths - Bolshoy Kazachy Lane 11 (1875-1876)
 Ovchinnikov baths - Bolshaya Pushkarskaya Street 22 (1876-1877)
 Belozerskie baths - Kropotkina Street 1 (1882)

Banks and corporations buildings 
First Mutual Credit Society House - 13 Griboedov Canal Embankment (1888-1890)
 Singer House - Nevsky Prospekt 28 (1902-1904)

Family 
Pavel Suzor was married to the daughter of Alexander Brulov, Sofia. They had two sons: Vladimir and Georgy.

References 

Russian architects
1844 births
1919 deaths
Art Nouveau architects